The Three of Us (Swedish: Vi tre) is a 1940 Swedish drama film directed by Schamyl Bauman and starring Sture Lagerwall, Signe Hasso and Stig Järrel. It was shot at the Centrumateljéerna Studios in Stockholm and on location around the city including the Central Station. The film's sets were designed by the art director Arthur Spjuth. It is a sequel to the 1939 film The Two of Us.

Synopsis
Rising architect Sture Ahrengren is so obsessed with his work that he neglects his wife Kristina and young son.

Cast
 Sture Lagerwall as Sture Ahrengren, arkitekt
 Signe Hasso as 	Kristina, hans hustru
 Olle Bauman as 	Olle, deras son
 Georg Løkkeberg as 	Arne Rank, arkitekt 
 Stig Järrel as 	Baltsar Ekberg, ingenjör
 Ilse-Nore Tromm as 	Helena, hans hustru
 Gösta Cederlund as 	Professor Hagstam
 Carl Barcklind as Dr Frodde
 Sven Bergvall as 	Mr. Brown 
 Astrid Bodin as 	Mrs. Blomgren 
 Gösta Bodin as 	Andersson, Restaurant Manager 
 Ingrid Borthen as 	Shop Assistant 
 Elsa Ebbesen as 	Frodde's Maid 
 John Ericsson as Mr. Hardwick 
 Emil Fjellström as 	Hooligan 
 Hartwig Fock as 	Drum Major 
 Agda Helin as 	Mrs. Andersson 
 Torsten Hillberg as 	Odelgren
 Nils Hultgren as 	Head Waiter Öqvist 
 Axel Högel as 	Man from Gas Factory 
 Stig Johanson as Waiter 
 Signe Lundberg-Settergren as 	Maid Stina
 Bellan Roos as 	Lisa 
 Ragnar Widestedt as 	Doctor 
 Arne Lindblad as 	Man at Tourist Information

References

Bibliography 
 Qvist, Per Olov & von Bagh, Peter. Guide to the Cinema of Sweden and Finland. Greenwood Publishing Group, 2000.

External links 
 

1940 films
Swedish drama films
1940 drama films
1940s Swedish-language films
Films directed by Schamyl Bauman
1940s Swedish films